Sven Palle Sørensen (23 November 1898 – 9 January 1978) was a Danish diver. He competed at the 1920 Summer Olympics and the 1924 Summer Olympics.

References

1898 births
1978 deaths
Danish male divers
Olympic divers of Denmark
Divers at the 1920 Summer Olympics
Divers at the 1924 Summer Olympics
Divers from Copenhagen